Melbourne bus route 901 is a bus route operated by Kinetic Melbourne between Frankston station and Melbourne Airport in Melbourne, Australia. It is part of the SmartBus network.

History
In the late 2000s and early 2010s orbital bus routes began being introduced in Melbourne as an alternative form of public transport to trains which allowed people to get to major areas without needing to go via the city. In 2008 route 901, was introduced as the yellow orbital and operated from Frankston station to Ringwood station, this route absorbed the former 665. It was operated by Grenda's Bus Services It later became part of the SmartBus network.

In September 2010 route 901 was extended to Melbourne Airport, partly replacing Dysons route 571, making it Melbourne's second longest bus route by distance and longest by total journey time.

It was included in the takeover of Grenda's by Ventura Bus Lines in January 2012. In August 2013 operation of the route was taken over by Transdev Melbourne as part of the Melbourne Metro bus franchise. In January 2022 operation of the route passed with the franchise to  Kinetic Melbourne.

Route
Route 901 operates from Frankston station to Melbourne Airport via the outer eastern and northern suburbs of Melbourne. It travels via Dandenong station, Westfield Knox, Ringwood station, Blackburn station, Eltham station, South Morang station, Epping station, Broadmeadows station and Gladstone Park.

Vehicles
Route 901 was initially operated by a dedicated fleet of Volgren bodied Mercedes-Benz OC500LEs painted in SmartBus silver and orange livery. These have been supersed by Gemilang and Volgren bodied Scanias in standard Public Transport Victoria livery.

References

Bus routes in Australia